Bispora is a genus of fungi belonging to the family Helotiaceae.

The species of this genus are found in the entire world. 

Species:

Bispora aegles 
Bispora antennata 
Bispora aterrima

References

Helotiaceae
Helotiales genera